Bennu is an ancient Egyptian deity. 

Bennu may also refer to:

 101955 Bennu, an asteroid discovered in 1999
 BennuGD, forked in 2010, a video game development platform